Burkholderia multivorans is a species in the phylum Pseudomonadota. The cells are rod-shaped. It is known to cause human disease, such as colonisation of the lung in cystic fibrosis.

References

External links
 Burkholderia J.P. Euzéby: List of Prokaryotic names with Standing in Nomenclature

Type strain of Burkholderia multivorans at BacDive -  the Bacterial Diversity Metadatabase

Burkholderiaceae
Bacteria described in 1997